Marjorie Estiano is the debut studio album by Brazilian singer Marjorie Estiano, released in 2005. The album was responsible for setting Marjorie to superstardom, along with her role in Brazilian teen soap opera Malhação, in 2004 and 2005.

Track listing
"So Easy"
"Você Sempre Será (You'll Always Be)"
"Por Mais Que Eu Tente (The More I Try)"
"As Horas (The Hours)"
"O Jogo (The Game)"
"Reflexo do Amor (Reflection of Love)"
"Versos Mudos (Mute Verses)" — feat. LS Jack
"O Que Tiver Que Ser (What Is Meant To Be)"
"Partes de Você (Parts of You)"
"Sem Direção (No Direction)"
"Tudo Passa (Everything Passes)"

Charts

Year-end charts

Sales

Personnel 
Vini Rosa: Guitar and Acoustic Guitar;
André Vasconselos: Bass;
Daniel Gordon: Drums and Percussion;
Lancaster: Bass;
George Fonseca: Keyboards;
Christiaan Oyens: Drums and Lap Steel Guitar;
André Aquino: Acoustic Guitar;
Victor Pozas: Keyboards;
Roberto Pollo: Keyboards;
Alexandre Castilho: Guitar;
Cristiano Gualda: Backing Vocal;
Juliano Cortuah: Backing Vocal;
Diogo Garneiro: Drums and Percussion;
Marcelo Martins: Sax;
Jeziel: Trumpet;
Renata Ly: Backing Vocal;
Cecilia Spyer: Backing Vocal;
Milton Guedes: Harmonica;
João Jaques: Acoustic Guitar;
LS Jack: Guest appearance.

References

2005 debut albums
Marjorie Estiano albums